People awarded the Honorary citizenship of Afghanistan are:

Honorary Citizens of Afghanistan
Listed by date of award:

References
 

Afghanistan
Afghan awards